Eribe Doro (born 26 March 2001) is a professional rugby league footballer who plays as a  for the Halifax Panthers in the Betfred Championship.

Background
Doro is of Nigerian descent. He went to The Blue Coat School, Oldham.

Career

2020
Doro made his Super League début in round 12 of the 2020 Super League season for the Wolves against Castleford Tigers.

2021
In round 11 of the 2021 Super League season, he scored his first try in the Super League during Warrington's 44-18 victory over Leigh.

References

External links
Wolves profile

2001 births
Living people
English rugby league players
English sportspeople of Nigerian descent
Halifax R.L.F.C. players
Rugby league players from Oldham
Rugby league props
Warrington Wolves players
Widnes Vikings players